The Ranch Resort is a family-owned leisure, sports, exhibition, conservation, accommodation, and conferencing centre within the  large Ranch Conservancy located in the Capricorn District of the Limpopo Province.  south of Polokwane – the capital city of the Limpopo Province – in South Africa. It is adjacent to the Makapansgat Valley, an archaeologically significant area that has produced fossils and bones that signify early hominid presence in Limpopo and forms part of Gauteng's Cradle of Humankind World Heritage Site.

A 12-hole par 3 – Executive Golf Course was officially opened in May, 2010 by the Premier of Limpopo Province, Mr. Cassel Mathale.

History
The Shearer family established The Ranch in May 1960 initially as a stopover for people travelling between Zimbabwe (then Rhodesia) and South Africa. As the establishment became better known, it developed into a leisure and conference resort, now known as The Ranch Resort.

On May 22, 2010 the Shearer family, owners of The Ranch Resort, celebrated 50 years in hospitality at a special function where The Premier of Limpopo Province, Mr Cassel Mathale, officially opened The Ranch Resort 12-hole, par-3 Executive Golf Course and Academy. VIP guests included the South African Minister of International Relations and Co-operation, Ms. Maite Nkoana Mashabane who gave the keynote address, and Minister of Health Dr. Aaron Motsoaledi.

Tourism
The Ranch Resort's geographical position is convenient for travelers visiting or passing through Polokwane and the Limpopo Province as it is centrally situated within the province. Limpopo offers many tourist attractions from mountains, forests, the Kruger National Park, private game reserves, and historical heritage attractions like the neighboring Makapansgat Valley World Heritage Site. The Ranch Resort offers visitor attractions in its own right, featuring daily activities like horseback safaris, game drives, lion tours, golf, eco-tourism, and sports activities.

Conservation
The Ranch Resort stands in a  nature conservancy, consisting of grasslands, and bushveld and is home to lions, giraffe, zebra, warthog, kudu, impala, wildebeest, and over 200 bird species, among other animals.  Active in wildlife rehabilitation since the 1960s (when organised conservation was in its infancy) The Ranch Resort continually offers shelter for orphaned or injured wildlife that cannot be released into the wild. Providing a safe haven for lions and other Big 5 animals from Zimbabwe which were under threat at a time of political and social instability.

Lions
The Ranch Resort is home to over 30 lions.

Lions in movies
Previous generations of The Ranch Resort lion prides have starred in movies including The Gods Must Be Crazy, King Solomon's Mines, Incident at Victoria Falls, The Lion Child (1993 film), The Ghost and the Darkness, Pride. The current lions and their forebears have appeared in a total of over 400 international movies, documentaries, and commercials. Resident animal trainer and handler Vivian "Viv" Bristow has extensive movie credits.

Eco-tourism
The Ranch Resort is licensed to allow close contact with its animals. Under the supervision of specialist rangers, visitors can walk with the lions and watch cubs at play or being bottle-fed. Horseback safaris have become a mainstay of animal-contact eco-tourism at this venue, offering visitors close-up encounters with giraffe, zebra, warthog, impala, kudu, and wildebeest. There are over 200 species of birds on the property.

Executive golf course and academy

In 2003 it was estimated that the economic impact of golf and golf-related spending in the province amounted to R 219 million per annum. To capitalise on the growing demand for executive golf facilities, The Ranch Resort developed a 12-hole par 3 executive golf course and academy. The Golf Course development was designed to harmonise with the natural bushveld surroundings. The resident golf pro is Sean Pappas, one of the three Pappas brothers and five-time Sunshine Tour event winner.

The Limpopo Province Premier, The Honourable Cassel Mathale performed the official opening on 22 May 2010 as part of The Ranch Resort celebrations of 50 years in hospitality. Mr Mathale said, "Our province is home to some of the best luxurious wildlife golf estate resorts in the country and the African continent as a whole. It is on this note that we are correctly regarded as a tourist province in the country. We are counting on the Ranch Hotel and other organisations to join hands with the government in the development of the game of golf."

Accommodation
Situated at The Ranch Resort is Protea Hotel The Ranch, a four-star hotel with over 100 en suite and air-conditioned rooms, presidential and executive suites, self-catering chalets, and an outdoor experience tented camp option for eco-tourism and team-building set in the natural bush.

The hotel offers deluxe facilities including fine dining. It was granted the Professional Management Review magazine (PMR) Golden Arrow in 2009 in the Executive Hotel category.

Conferences
The Ranch Resort has facilities for large and compact conferences and is host to local government, eco-tourism, conservation, and commercial conferences.  It was granted the Professional Management Review magazine (PMR) 2009 Golden Arrow award for excellence in convention/conference centres.

Weddings
The Ranch Resort has its own non-denominational chapel, set in a Rose Garden as a wedding venue for traditional or themed weddings.

The Ranch SkyDiving Boogie and Symposium

The Ranch SkyDiving Boogie and Symposium is an annual sports skydiving and parachuting event held at Protea Hotel Ranch Resort.

The event attracts sport, competition, professional, and military skydivers and parachutists from across Southern Africa and features informative and educational seminars and presentations.  Certain presentations are open to the public and the event encourages public participation through tandem introductory skydiving.

Organised by professional skydivers Mike Rumble and Graham Field, the event is sanctioned by the Parachute Association of South Africa and is regarded as South Africa's Premier Sports Skydiving event.

The event generates significant exposure through newspapers, magazines, TV, and radio.

2011

In 2011 The Ranch SkyDiving Boogie and Symposium ran from 9 to 12 August.   Coinciding with National Women's Day, Miss Limpopo Kholofelo Madiba, was trained to skydive at the event and completed 5 Accelerated Freefall skydives.

The event received representation from 21 different sport skydiving operations and military parachuting units from across Southern Africa.

The South African National Defence Force (SANDF) saw The Ranch SkyDiving Boogie and Symposium as an ideal opportunity to enhance cooperation and learning opportunities, promoting military interest in sport skydiving and the inter-operability with the Parachute Association of South Africa (PASA), whilst learning and sharing ideas by participating at events and with skydiving clubs outside of the military.

78 members of the public experienced a tandem introductory skydive at the event.

Two turbine Atlas Angels flew a total of 90 loads to 12 000 ft over the five days of the event.

2012

Making use of two turbine Atlas Angels aircraft the 2012 Ranch SkyDiving Boogie and Symposium ran from 5 to 9 August, and once again coincided with National Women's Day.

An all female South African Skydiving Hybrid formation was successfully completed at the event on National Women's Day.

The 2012 event also raised awareness and funds as part of the African Conservation Trust's SkyDive for Rhinos 2012 campaign.

'Father of FreeFly' Olav Zipser attended the event and came on board as an International Ambassador for the SkyDive for Rhinos campaign.

The event featured presentations on  Olav Zipser's FreeFly Astronaut Project, the 400-Way World Skydiving Record, the Red Bull X-Alps, the Rhino Poaching Crisis, and the 'Safety First Aviator' campaign by the Aero Club of South Africa.

The Sport Skydivers Association Formation Skydiving, Artistic Events, and Canopy Piloting committees provided coaches and load organising, and hosted skills camps, seminars, and presentations at the event.

Government recognition

The Ranch Resort's role in attracting eco-tourism to the Province has been given recognition by the Limpopo Provincial government and the government of South Africa.  On 22 May 2010, South African Minister of International Relations and Co-operation, Ms Maite Nkoana-Mashabane, accompanied by the Minister of Health Dr Aaron Motsoaledi, gave the keynote address at the resort's 50th-anniversary celebrations, during which she paid tribute to its many developments which have contributed to tourism growth. The Minister said "I have been part of this journey in so many ways, and I am really honoured to launch this 50th Anniversary year. I remember the elephants and the lions coming from Zimbabwe to live at The Ranch Resort … the opening of the bush camp … the development of the Ranch Conservancy and the introduction of 23 species of wild animals... construction of the new conference venues. And now, this evening, we have all been privileged to be present at the birth of the Executive Golf Course and Academy."

Covid-19 quarantine centre

During the COVID-19 pandemic in South Africa, The Ranch Resort was selected by the South African government as the quarantine centre for 112 South African students, teachers and citizens being repatriated from Wuhan in China after the World Health Organization (WHO) declared the coronavirus a global pandemic on 11 March 2020.

The self-contained hotel complex was selected for its remoteness, as there are no communities nearby, and because of its proximity to Polokwane International Airport 31.4km away.

During the 14 day quarantine period the resort was secured and patrolled by the South African Police Service and the South African National Defence Force to ensure no unauthorised personnel breached the premises, as well as to ensure the quarantine was observed conscientiously.

The Ranch Resort was not a facility for infected patients. Medical screening was performed prior to departure and four South Africans who were showing signs of coronavirus were left behind to mitigate risk. Only South Africans who tested negative were repatriated.
 
Test results cleared all the South Africans, including the flight crew, pilots, hotel staff, police, and soldiers involved in the humanitarian mission who, as a precautionary measure, all remained under observation and in quarantine for a 14-day period.

President Cyril Ramaphosa declared the Ranch Resort coronavirus-free and a 'green zone' in his appreciation and send off speech delivered at The Ranch Resort on 29 March 2020.

Location
It is situated between the South African National Highway N1 and the R101 – with entrances to The Ranch Resort from both roads. It has its own airstrip.

Private airstrip
The Ranch Resort has its own private airstrip which runs parallel to the golf course and close to the main buildings.  It is a grass/bush strip running North East/South West.  It is 1.2km long and does not have any runway lights.

See also

 List of hotels in South Africa

References

External links
 The Ranch Resort website
 The Ranch Resort Walk With Lions Video
 The Ranch Resort Google Maps
 Ranch SkyDiving Boogie and Symposium 2012 Video

Hotels in South Africa
Resorts in South Africa
Golf clubs and courses in South Africa
Buildings and structures in Limpopo
Tourist attractions in Limpopo